The National School of Government (previously known as the Civil Service College and the Centre for Management and Policy Studies, or CMPS) was the part of the Cabinet Office that ran training, organisational development and consultancy courses for UK civil servants and private individual learners. It was mostly based at Sunningdale Park, near Ascot in Berkshire, but had other centres on Belgrave Road in London, and later in Edinburgh.

History
The Civil Service College was established at Sunningdale Park in June 1970. It evolved to become the National School of Government which also managed Sunningdale Institute – a virtual academy of leading thinkers on management, organisation and governance. The National School of Government closed on 31 March 2012. Very few of its main functions have been taken on by a new body, Civil Service Learning, which is part of the Cabinet Office.

Sunningdale Institute
The Sunningdale Institute was an academy managed by the National School of Government, described as "a virtual academy of leading thinkers on management, organisation and governance."

See also
Cabinet Office
Civil Service (United Kingdom)

References

External links 
National School of Government
National School of Government, Sunningdale Institute

Civil service colleges
Further education colleges in Berkshire
Civil Service (United Kingdom)
Education in the Royal Borough of Windsor and Maidenhead
Defunct departments of the Government of the United Kingdom
Cabinet Office (United Kingdom)
2012 disestablishments in the United Kingdom